The 2001 MBNA Platinum 400 was a NASCAR Winston Cup Series racing event held on June 3, 2001, at Dover Downs International Speedway in Dover, Delaware.

Qualifying was rained out, and Dale Jarrett would start on pole.

Contested over 400 laps, it was the thirteenth race of the 2001 season. Jeff Gordon of Hendrick Motorsports took his second win of the season leading 381 out of the 400 laps, while Steve Park finished second and Dale Earnhardt Jr. finished third. Jarrett retained his points lead but was reduced from 75 points to 50.

Sixteen lead changes were made in this 199-minute event. While the average green flag run was almost 62 laps, more than 7% of the race was held under a caution flag.

Report

Background

Dover Downs International Speedway, now called Dover International Speedway is one of five short tracks to hold NASCAR races; the others are Bristol Motor Speedway, Richmond International Raceway, Martinsville Speedway, and ISM Raceway. The track's turns are banked at twenty-four degrees, and both the front stretch (the location of the finish line) and the backstretch are banked at nine degrees.

Entry list

Qualifying 
Qualifying was rained out, thus Dale Jarrett would win the pole based on the 2001 NASCAR Winston Cup Series rulebook.

Results

References

MBNA Platinum 400
MBNA Platinum 400
NASCAR races at Dover Motor Speedway